Garmarud (also Romanized as Garmārūd) is a village in Alamut-e Pain Rural District, Rudbar-e Alamut District, Qazvin County, Qazvin Province, Iran. At the 2006 census, its population was 300, in 111 families.

In The Valley of the Assassins, Garmarud is mentioned by British traveller and explorer Freya Stark as a place she visits during one of her Persian tours in the 1930s. She describes the immediate region in some detail.

References 

Populated places in Qazvin County